Alonzo Stephen "Lonnie" Spragg (2 October 1879 – 12 February 1904) was a rugby union player who represented Australia.

Spragg, a centre, was born in Redfern, New South Wales and claimed four international rugby caps for Australia. He did not start playing rugby until he was seventeen and two years later he made his Test debut was against Great Britain, at Sydney, on 24 June 1899, the inaugural rugby Test match played by an Australian national representative side.  Due to funding constraints he was one of only six New South Wales players (with Charlie Ellis, Hyram Marks, Bob McCowan, Peter Ward & Robert Challoner) selected to make the trip to Brisbane four weeks later for the second Test. Zavos describes Spragg as a "crack three-quarter" and a "brilliant outside back". He quotes contemporary commentators describing Spragg as "possessing rare gifts, denoting a special aptitude for the game.....a splendid kick, either place or drop and eager and capable on defence"

Spragg was also a state representative oarsman, and a cricketer who captained the Norths Brisbane Cricket Club.

Spragg died in February 1904 at the age of 25, from appendicitis and peritonitis. A memorial was erected at Toowong Cemetery to his memory.

Published references
 Collection (1995) Gordon Bray presents The Spirit of Rugby, Harper Collins Publishers Sydney
 Howell, Max (2005) Born to Lead – Wallaby Test Captains, Celebrity Books, Auckland NZ

Footnotes

External links
Spragg Stephen Alvinzo – Brisbane City Council Grave Location Search (Note that his middle name is wrong).

Australian rugby union players
Australia international rugby union players
1879 births
1904 deaths
Burials at Toowong Cemetery
Rugby union players from Sydney
Rugby union centres